As a nickname, Jez most commonly is a diminutive form of the given name Jeremy (roughly homophonous to "Jers" in non-rhotic accents), Jezebel, Jeremiah, Jerahmeel, and Jezreel.

The Jez nickname can often be extended to form other nicknames, still based on the name Jezreel, such as Jezza or Jezzie. It may refer to:

People with the nickname 

 Jez Alborough (born 1959), English writer and illustrator
 Jez Butterworth (born 1969), English playwright, screenwriter and director
 Jez Carne, Australian radio presenter
 Jez Coad, English record producer and musician
 Jez George (born 1970), English football manager and executive
 Jez Lowe (born 1955), English folk singer-songwriter
 Jez Moxey (born 1963), English football executive
 Jez Nelson, British jazz broadcaster and television producer
 Jez San (born 1966), English programmer
 Jez Strode (born 1958), English drummer
 Jez Williams (born 1970), English musician
 Jez Wilson (born 1979), English boxer

Fictional characters with the nickname 

 Jeremy Usborne, one of the main characters of the British TV series Peep Show
 Jessica Lockhart, a character in The Kingdom Keepers series of novels.
 Jezz Torrent, lead singer for the fictional band "Love Fist" in Grand Theft Auto: Vice City
 Jeremy "Jez" Brockhollow, a badger socialite in Dimension 20: Mice and Murder

See also 

 Jezza (disambiguation)

Lists of people by nickname